Vargstenen (English: The Wolf Stone) is the fifth studio album by Viking metal band Månegarm. It was released in 2007.

Track listing

References

External links
Månegarm's official website

Månegarm albums
2007 albums